Tom Phelan was an Australian rugby league footballer who played in the 1900s. He played for Western Suburbs in the New South Wales Rugby League (NSWRL) competition. Phelan was a foundation player for Western Suburbs.

Playing career
Phelan made his first grade debut for Western Suburbs against Balmain in Round 1 1908 at Birchgrove Oval which was also the opening week of the New South Wales Rugby League (NSWRL) competition in Australia.  Balmain would go on to win the match 24–0.

Phelan played 5 games for Wests in their inaugural season which were all losses.  Western Suburbs would go on to finish second last on the table above last placed Cumberland who were dissolved at the conclusion of the season.

The following year, Phelan made 9 appearances for Wests as the club finished last on the table and claimed the wooden spoon.  Phelan's final game for Wests was against Newtown in Round 10 1909 at Wentworth Park in which Phelan captained the side.

At representative level, Phelan represented New South Wales on one occasion.

References

Year of birth missing
Australian rugby league players
Western Suburbs Magpies players
New South Wales rugby league team players
Year of death missing
Place of death missing
Place of birth missing
Rugby league fullbacks
Rugby league second-rows
Rugby league wingers